Jack Coughlin (born 1932, Connecticut, USA) is an artist of Irish-American heritage who is best known for his portraits of literary figures and musicians. As a figurative artist and member of the National Academy of Design, Coughlin’s work is in many prominent collections including the Metropolitan Museum and the Museum of Modern Art in New York, the National Collection of Fine Arts in Washington D.C., the Norfolk Museum of Arts and Sciences in Virginia, the Worcester Art Museum in Massachusetts, the University of Colorado, the Philadelphia Free Public Library, Staedelsches Kunstinstitut, Frankfort, Germany, and the New University of Ulster, Coleraine, Northern Ireland.

Born in Greenwich, Connecticut Coughlin studied at the Rhode Island School of Design and the Art Students League of New York.  Although Coughlin’s education coincided with the heyday of Abstract Expressionism, he has always been drawn to figurative traditions in European and American art.

Art
Coughlin's portraits are regularly commissioned for the New Republic magazine and have been published in several volumes of poetry in Ireland and the United States. However, in prints and drawings from the 1960s to the present, he has also pursued a vein of imagery that is much less naturalistic and that explores a range of sources, from the anatomical drawings of George Stubbs to the grotesque hybrids of European printmakers like Francisco Goya and Martin Schongauer. In many metamorphic, dream like images, absurd and mysterious juxtapositions of the human and animal join in an irrational evolutionary journey. Here his automatic drawing practice is akin to that of the Surrealists and is wed to his interests in the existential wordplay of Samuel Beckett.

Teaching career
Celebrated for his combinations of innovative and traditional techniques during the resurgence of intaglio, lithograph, and woodcut printmaking in the 1960s and 70s, Coughlin taught printmaking at University of Massachusetts Amherst from the foundation of its art department until his retirement over 35 years later. In 2005 Coughlin received the Gladys E. Cook prize at the 2005 annual exhibition at the National Academy of Design.

References

1932 births
20th-century American painters
American male painters
21st-century American painters
Living people
Art Students League of New York alumni
Rhode Island School of Design alumni
20th-century American male artists